Fideo may refer to:

Food
 Fideo, the Spanish word for noodle
 Sopa de fideo, noodle soup used in Spanish, Mexican, Tex-Mex, and Latin Caribbean cuisine.

People
 Samu Castillejo, nicknamed El Fideo, a Spanish professional footballer
 Ángel Di María, nicknamed Fideo, an Argentine professional footballer

Places
 Fideo, Syria

Arts, entertainment, and media
 Fideo, a character from the film Once Upon a Time in Mexico
 Fideo 9 (also Video 9), a Welsh language television programme broadcast on Sianel 4 Cymru (S4C) from 1988 to 1992
 Fideo Ardena, a character from the series Inazuma Eleven

See also
 Fideuà
 Video